The 2006 Berlin state election was held on 17 September 2006 to elect the members of the 16th Abgeordnetenhaus of Berlin. The incumbent government of the Social Democratic Party (SPD) and Party of Democratic Socialism (PDS) narrowly retained a majority, though PDS suffered major losses. Mayor Klaus Wowereit continued in office.

Parties
The table below lists parties represented in the previous, 15th Abgeordnetenhaus of Berlin.

Opinion polling

Election result

|-
! colspan="2" | Party
! Votes
! %
! +/-
! Seats 
! +/-
! Seats %
|-
| bgcolor=| 
| align=left | Social Democratic Party (SPD)
| align=right| 424,054
| align=right| 30.8
| align=right| 1.1
| align=right| 53
| align=right| 9
| align=right| 35.6
|-
| bgcolor=| 
| align=left | Christian Democratic Union (CDU)
| align=right| 294,026
| align=right| 21.3
| align=right| 2.5
| align=right| 37
| align=right| 2
| align=right| 24.8
|-
| bgcolor=| 
| align=left | Party of Democratic Socialism (PDS)
| align=right| 185,185
| align=right| 13.4
| align=right| 9.2
| align=right| 23
| align=right| 10
| align=right| 15.4
|-
| bgcolor=| 
| align=left | Alliance 90/The Greens (Grüne)
| align=right| 180,865
| align=right| 13.1
| align=right| 4.0
| align=right| 23
| align=right| 9
| align=right| 15.4
|-
| bgcolor=| 
| align=left | Free Democratic Party (FDP)
| align=right| 104,584
| align=right| 7.6
| align=right| 2.3
| align=right| 13
| align=right| 2
| align=right| 8.7
|-
! colspan=8|
|-
|  
| align=left | The Grays – Gray Panthers (Graue)
| align=right| 52,884
| align=right| 3.8
| align=right| 2.4
| align=right| 0
| align=right| ±0
| align=right| 0
|-
| bgcolor=#FF8000| 
| align=left | Labour and Social Justice – The Electoral Alternative (WASG)
| align=right| 40,504
| align=right| 2.9
| align=right| New
| align=right| 0
| align=right| New
| align=right| 0
|-
| bgcolor=| 
| align=left | National Democratic Party (NPD)
| align=right| 35,229
| align=right| 2.6
| align=right| 1.7
| align=right| 0
| align=right| ±0
| align=right| 0
|-
| bgcolor=|
| align=left | Others
| align=right| 60,024
| align=right| 4.4
| align=right| 
| align=right| 0
| align=right| ±0
| align=right| 0
|-
! align=right colspan=2| Total
! align=right| 1,377,355
! align=right| 100.0
! align=right| 
! align=right| 149
! align=right| 8
! align=right| 
|-
! align=right colspan=2| Voter turnout
! align=right| 
! align=right| 58.0
! align=right| 10.1
! align=right| 
! align=right| 
! align=right| 
|}

References

State election, 2006
2006 elections in Germany
2006 in Berlin